The Miri Crocodile Farm cum Mini Zoo is a crocodile farm and zoo in Miri, Sarawak, Malaysia. It is registered by the Convention on International Trade in Endangered Species of Wild Fauna and Flora.

History
The farm and zoo was opened on 16 August 1998. It became the second crocodile farm opened in Sarawak after the Jong Crocodile Farm and Zoo in Kuching.

Architecture
The farm and zoo is located in a 9 hectare of area near the mouth of Baram River. Man-made ponds were created for the breeding ground of the crocodiles. It houses more than 1,000 species of crocodiles. It also features an information center about various aspects of crocodiles, such as fatal clashes with humans, life cycle etc.

Operation
The monthly expenses for the farm and zoo is around MYR40,000-50,000, in which mostly goes to buying foods for the animals and its 15 staffs salary. They regularly seek assistance from the Tourism Board.

See also
 List of tourist attractions in Malaysia

References

External links

 

1998 establishments in Malaysia
Buildings and structures in Sarawak
Crocodile farms in Malaysia
Tourist attractions in Sarawak